Yeiser is a surname. Notable people with the surname include:

Idabelle Yeiser (born 1897), African-American poet and writer
Jimmie Yeiser, American educator
Sarah Yeiser Mason (1896–1980), American screenwriter and script supervisor

See also
David Yeiser House